Khattabi may refer to:

Abd el-Krim  (1882/1883–1963), Moroccan political and military leader.
Ali El-Khattabi or Ali Elkhattabi (born 1977), Dutch-Moroccan footballer
Elarbi Khattabi (born 1967), Moroccan long-distance runner
Fadila Khattabi (born 1962), French politician, member of the French National Assembly representing Côte-d'Or
Younes Khattabi (born 1984), Moroccan rugby league footballer 
Zakia Khattabi (born 1976), Belgian-Moroccan politician

See also
Khattab (name)